Sam Newfield, born Samuel Neufeld (December 6, 1899 – November 10, 1964), also known as Sherman Scott or Peter Stewart, was an American B-movie director, one of the most prolific in American film history—he is credited with directing over 250 feature films in a career which began during the silent era and ended in 1958. In addition to his staggering feature output, he also directed one -and two-reel comedy shorts, training films, industrial films, TV episodes and pretty much anything anyone would pay him for. Because of this massive output—he would sometimes direct more than 20 films in a single year—he has been called the most prolific director of the sound era.

Many of Newfield's films were made for PRC Pictures. This was a film production company headed by his brother Sigmund Neufeld. The films PRC produced were low-budget productions, the majority being westerns, with an occasional horror film or crime drama.

Family and education
Newfield completed one year of high school, according to the 1940 US census. Brother Morris Neufeld was a stage actor, according to the 1930 US census.

Pseudonyms
Sam Newfield was credited as Sherman Scott and Peter Stewart on a number of films he made for PRC. He used these names in order to hide the fact that one person was responsible for so many of PRC's films.

Partial filmography
Partial filmography is listed below for the different names he used.

As Sam Newfield
Big Time or Bust (1933)
Reform Girl (1933)
The Important Witness (1933)
 Beggar's Holiday (1934)
Undercover Men (1934)
Marrying Widows  (1934)   
Bulldog Courage (1935)
Racing Luck (1935)
Timber War (1935)
The Traitor (1936)
 The Lion's Den (1936)
The Fighting Deputy (1937)
The Gambling Terror (1937)
Trail of Vengeance (1937)
The Feud Maker (1938)
The Terror of Tiny Town (1938)
Six-Gun Trail (1938)
 The Invisible Killer (1939)
The Fighting Renegade (1939)
Frontier Crusader (1940)
Marked Men (1940)
 Secrets of a Model (1940)
Texas Renegades (1940)
The Mad Monster (1942)
Tiger Fangs (1943)
The Black Raven (1943)
I Accuse My Parents (1944)
Swing Hostess (1944)
The Monster Maker (1944)
His Brother's Ghost (1945)
Shadows of Death (1945)
The Lady Confesses (1945)
Rustlers' Hideout (1945)
Apology for Murder (1945)
White Pongo (1945)
 Gas House Kids (1946)
Fight That Ghost (1946)
 House-Rent Party (film) (1946)
 Outlaws of the Plains (1946)
Jungle Flight (1947)
Money Madness (1948)
Western Pacific Agent (1950)
 Skipalong Rosenbloom (1951)
Lost Continent (1951)
Lady in the Fog (aka Scotland Yard Inspector) (1952)
The Gambler and the Lady (1952)
 Outlaw Women (1952)
Thunder over Sangoland (1955)
The Wild Dakotas (1956)
The Three Outlaws (1956)
Frontier Gambler (1956)
Last of the Desperadoes (1956)
Wolf Dog (1958)
Flaming Frontier (1958)

As Sherman Scott
Hitler, Beast of Berlin (1939)
I Take This Oath (1940)
Billy the Kid's Gun Justice (1940)
Billy the Kid's Fighting Pals (1941)
Billy the Kid's Smoking Guns (1942)
The Flying Serpent (1946)
Lady at Midnight (1948)
The Strange Mrs. Crane (1948)
The Wild Weed (1949)

As Peter Stewart
 Gun Code (1940)
Black Mountain Stage (1940)
Adventure Island (1947)
The Counterfeiters  (1948)
State Department: File 649 (1949)

Film statistics
Between 1923 and 1930 Newfield directed over 50 comedies. Feature films statistics per year, starting with 1933, are summarised in the following table.

See also
Fred Olen Ray, another B movie director who has used many of these pseudonyms

References

 Review of Tiger Fangs

External links

1899 births
1964 deaths
Film directors from New York City
American Jews